Lorette may refer to the following places:

Place names 
 Lorette River, a tributary of Saint-Charles River, in Capitale-Nationale, Quebec, Canada
 Lorette, Loire, a commune in the Loire department, France
 Lorette, Manitoba, a community in Manitoba, Canada
 Loreto, Marche, a hill town and commune in Ancona, Italy, called Lorette in French

Others 
Lorette is also used to describe:
 Pommes de terre Lorette, a fried potato dish from French cuisine.
 Lorette (prostitution), a type of 19c French prostitute.

See also
 Notre Dame de Lorette (disambiguation)